Daming Lake is the largest lake in the city of Jinan, Shandong, China and one of city's main natural and cultural landmarks. Located to the north of the historical city center, the lake is fed by the artesian karst springs of the area and hence retains a fairly constant water level through the entire year.

Islands

Located in the lake are nine small islands:
Cuiliuping Island, also known as 
Niaoqingqiqi Island
Guting Island, the location of the Lixia Pavilion
Mingshi Island
Huiquan Island
Huxin Island
Jiaxuan Island
Qiuliu Island
Huju Island

Buildings

The lake is surrounded by a park with an ensemble of historical buildings, some of which stand on the islands in the lake:

Lixia Pavilion
The Lixia Pavilion is located on an island off the lake's east shore.
The pavilion is said to mark the spot of a meeting between the Tang dynasty poet Du Fu and the calligrapher Li Yong (678–747). The pavilion was rebuilt in 1693 and features inscriptions by the Qing-dynasty calligrapher He Shaoji and the Kangxi Emperor.

Lake Center Pavilion
The Lake Center Pavilion is set on an island near the lake's center.

Moon-lit Pavilion

The Moon-lit Pavilion is located on the north-eastern shore of the lake. It is connected to a large hall via a bridge. Military governor Han Fuju had an emergency escape tunnel constructed that connected the basement of this hall to the outer city. The tunnel was used by Kuomintang general Wang Yaowu to escape from the city at the end of the Battle of Jinan.

Jiuqu Pavilion
The Jiuqu Pavilion is located on the southwest shore of the Lake.

Haoran Pavilion
The Haoran Pavilion stands on the lake's south shore.

Ancestral Hall of Lord Tie

The Ancestral Hall of Lord Tie is located on the northwest shore of the Lake.
It is a memorial to Tie Xuan, a Ming-dynasty official during the reign of the Jianwen Emperor. Tie Xuan was renowned for his heroism and loyalty in the defense of the city against the rebelling Prince Zhu Di, the later Yongle Emperor. The memorial hall was erected during the times of the Qing dynasty.

Xiaocanglang Pavilion
The Xiaocanglang Pavilion is located on the lake's northwest shore.

Huiquan Hall
Huiquan Hall

Beiji Temple

Beiji Temple is a taoist temple dedicated to Xuan Wu, the god of the North. It was first built in the early Yuan dynasty, but rebuilt during the reign of the Yongle Emperor of the Ming dynasty. Numerous renovations were carried out during the Qing dynasty. The temple contains several halls as well as a bell and a drum tower. It stands on a seven-meter tall base and covers an area of 1078 square meters.

Huibo Building

The Huibo Building is located near the east gate of Daming Lake Park. It stands on the site of the watergate that controls the outflow of the Daming Lake into the Xiaoqing River.

Nanfeng Ancestral Hall

The Nanfeng Ancestral Hall is a memorial to the Song-dynasty scholar Zeng Gong. The present structure has been rebuilt in 1829.

Jiaxuan Ancestral Hall

The Jiaxuan Ancestral Hall commemorates Xin Qiji, a military leader and statesman of the Southern Song dynasty who was born in Jinan. The temple buildings cover a total area of 1400 square meters. Converted for other uses during the Republic of China, the temple was restored to its present function in 1961.

Oushen's Temple
Oushen's Temple is a memorial temple that was originally dedicated to the Goddess of the Lotus Root. During the Qing dynasty it was rededicated to the memory of Li Qingzhao

Daming Lake Nanfeng Theater
The Daming Lake Nanfeng Theater is located in the courtyard of the Nanfeng Ancestral Hall and was constructed during the late Qing dynasty.

Gardens

The park that surrounds Daming Lake features six traditional Chinese gardens:

Xia Garden
The Xia Garden is a traditional courtyard garden that is located to the south of the lake and covers an area of about 9600 square meters. The garden dates back to the year 1909 and was formerly part of the Shandong Provincial Library.

Jiaxuan Garden
()

Qiuliu Garden
()

Huju Garden
()

Nanfeng Garden
()

Qishi Guanyu Garden
().

History

As a central site in the historical center of Jinan, Daming Lake has been the setting of many events in the history of the city: As his rebellion against the Mongol ruler Kublai Khan came to an end in 1262, the governor Li Tan tried to drown himself in the lake. He was rescued by the Mongols in order to be executed by being put in a sack and trampled to death by horses. The warlord Zhang Zongchang, nicknamed the "Dogmeat General" and unpopular because of his heavy-handed rule, planned to erect a living shrine to himself on the lake, but the plans were not executed due to Zhang's fall from power. During the Battle of Jinan in the Chinese Civil War, the commander of the city's defense against the communist People's Liberation Army, Kuomintang General Wang Yaowu had his command post near the lake shore.

From March 2006 to April 2007, the Daming Lake Park was renovated and extended to connect all portions of the park for unified access. To achieve this, 1788  housing units (including 1639 residential units) were demolished. Since the expansion, the Daming Lake Park covers a total of 103.4 hectares, 29.4 hectares (land: 20 hectares, lake 29.4 hectares) of which were added in the expansion.

Literature
The scenery of Daming Lake has been a topic of Chinese literature for at least about 1,500 years. The lake is mentioned in "Commentary on the Waterways Classic" by Northern Wei dynasty writer and geographer Li Daoyuan (died 527). It is described in "A Trip to Jinan" by the Jin dynasty poet Yuan Haowen (1235) and was also described by Marco Polo a bit later. The scenery of Daming Lake is also featured in the novel "The Travels of Lao Can" by Liu E and the essay "The Winter of Jinan" by Lao She.
Daming Lake is also the subject of a poem by Zhang Zongchang, military governor of Shandong from 1920 to 1928, that has been frequently quoted to ridicule him:

The Daming ("Daming" means "big brightness") Lake, the bright lake is big

In the Daming Lake are lotus flowers

On the lotuses are toads

[You] prick them once, [the toads] leap once

Visitors
Because of its cultural significance, the Daming Lake has attracted visits by artists, scholars, and political figures over the centuries.
Recorded visitors include:

Tang dynasty
Li Yong, calligrapher
Du Fu, poet
Duan Chengshi, scholar

Song dynasty
Zeng Gong, Su Zhe, Chao Buzhi, writers
Li Qingzhao and Xin Qiji, poets

Jin dynasty
Yuan Haowen, poet and writer

Yuan dynasty
Zhao Mengfu, painter
Zhang Yanghao, poet

Ming dynasty
Tie Xuan, provincial official, honored in the Lord Tie Ancestral Hall
Bian Gong and Li Panlong, scholars

Qing dynasty
Zhu Yizun and Ruan Yuan, scholars
Wang Shizhen, poet
Gao Fenghan, painter
Jiang Shiquan, playwright
He Shaoji, calligrapher
Pu Songling and Liu E, novelists

Modern China
Guo Moruo and Lao She, writers
Mao Zedong (in 1958) and Zhou Enlai (in 1959), politicians

Location
Daming Lake is located to the north of Minghu Road and to the south of the old city moat. The park is accessible through 4 gates, the north gate, the east gate, the main gate in the south, and the southwest gate.

See also
List of sites in Jinan

References

External links

 Official Site

Lakes of China
Bodies of water of Shandong
Tourist attractions in Jinan